Fan Kexin (born 19 September 1993) is a Chinese short-track speed-skater. She has been on the Chinese national team since 2010. She won two silver medals in the 500 meters and 3000 meters relay at the 2010 ISU World Junior Championships. In 2011, she won her first gold medal at the World Championships on the 500 meters and another gold medal in the 3000 meters relay. She won a gold medal in the 3000 m relay event and a silver medal in the 500 m event in 2012.

In the 2014 Winter Olympics, she had been regarded as the favorite in 500 meters before the game since she was 2nd on that distance in the 2013–2014 season while the strongest Chinese skater Wang Meng was injured and couldn't participate. However, she fell in the second lap in the semifinals and ranked 5th at last. She won a silver medal eight days later in 1000 meters.

In the 2022 Winter Olympics, Fan won a gold medal in the 2000 m mixed relay but failed to advance in the 500m quarter-final. Controversy emerged after footage of her appearing to flick a lane marker in her opponent's path, causing her opponent to crash; it was unclear whether her action was deliberate.

International competition podiums

References

External links

1993 births
Living people
Chinese female short track speed skaters
Olympic short track speed skaters of China
Olympic gold medalists for China
Olympic silver medalists for China
Olympic bronze medalists for China
Olympic medalists in short track speed skating
Short track speed skaters at the 2014 Winter Olympics
Short track speed skaters at the 2018 Winter Olympics
Short track speed skaters at the 2022 Winter Olympics
Medalists at the 2014 Winter Olympics
Medalists at the 2022 Winter Olympics
Asian Games medalists in short track speed skating
Asian Games gold medalists for China
Asian Games silver medalists for China
Short track speed skaters at the 2011 Asian Winter Games
Short track speed skaters at the 2017 Asian Winter Games
Medalists at the 2011 Asian Winter Games
Medalists at the 2017 Asian Winter Games
People from Qitaihe
World Short Track Speed Skating Championships medalists
21st-century Chinese women